Cambarus speleocoopi, the Sweet Home Alabama cave crayfish, is a small, freshwater crayfish endemic to Marshall County, Alabama in the United States. It is an underground species known only from 4 caves.

Distribution
The Alabama cave crayfish is known from cave systems in the Paint Rock River basin between Mount St. Olive and Cushion.

References

Cambaridae
Cave crayfish
Endemic fauna of Alabama
Freshwater crustaceans of North America
Crustaceans described in 2009